The Dutch Tweede Divisie in the 1967–68 season was contested by 20 teams. FC Wageningen won the championship and would be promoted to the Eerste Divisie along with two other teams.

New entrants
Relegated from the Eerste Divisie:
 De Graafschap
 SC Drente
(Helmond Sport played as Helmondia '55 last season)

League standings

Promotion play-off
Owing to the second-, third-, and fourth-place finishers obtaining an equal number of points, a promotion play-off needed to be held. Two teams would be promoted to the Eerste Divisie.

See also
 1967–68 Eredivisie
 1967–68 Eerste Divisie

References
Netherlands - List of final tables (RSSSF)

Tweede Divisie seasons
3
Neth